Barany Bugor is a rural locality (a selo) in Semibugrinsky Selsoviet, Kamyzyaksky District, Astrakhan Oblast, Russia. The population was 225 as of 2010. There are 3 streets.

Geography 
Barany Bugor is located on the Bolda River, 35 km northeast of Kamyzyak (the district's administrative centre) by road. Semibugry is the nearest rural locality.

References 

Rural localities in Kamyzyaksky District